Royal Christmas Gala was a co-headlining concert tour by Sarah Brightman, Gregorian, Mario Frangoulis, Narcis Iustin Ianău, and Fernando Varela, The tour began on 20 November 2017, in Aalborg, Denmark, and concluded on 23 December that year, in Vienna, Austria, two days before Christmas. The tour consisted of a total 23 dates, including Brightman's first visit to Poland, and centered around the festive season.

Set list 
ACT I
 Land of Hope and Glory 
 Celebrate Christmas  
 You See the Snow 
 Walking in the Air  
 Peace On Earth 
 Jingle Bells  
 Panis angelicus 
 Christmas Morning 
 The Fountain 
 Child in a Manger 
 Mistletoad and Wine  
 Ave Maria  
 O mio babbino caro  
 Gloria 
 All by Myself 
 Nessun dorma 
ACT II
 Dr Zhivago Lara's Theme 
 Ave Maria 
 Pie Jesu 
 Silent Night 
 La Luna 
 Nutcracker 
 Gaudate / Ding Dong 
 In Dulce Jubilo 
 Arrival 
 I Believe in Father Christmas 
 The Phantom of the Opera 
 Time to Say Goodbye 
Encore
 Fairytale in New York 
 Hymn 
 Amazing Grace 
 Happy Christmas

Tour dates

References

Sarah Brightman concert tours
2017 concert tours
Co-headlining concert tours